Saenger Theatre (or Theater) may refer to any of the movie theatres in the defunct Saenger Theatre chain, including:

 Saenger Theatre (Mobile, Alabama)
 Saenger Theatre (Pine Bluff, Arkansas), listed on the US National Register of Historic Places
 Saenger Theatre (Pensacola, Florida), NRHP-listed
 Saenger Theatre (New Orleans), Louisiana, NRHP-listed
 Saenger Theater (Biloxi, Mississippi), NRHP-listed in Harrison County
 Saenger Theatre (Hattiesburg, Mississippi), NRHP-listed in Forrest County
 Saenger Theater (Texarkana, Texas), NRHP-listed in Bowie County

See also
 Saengerfest Halle, or the Col Ballroom, Davenport, Iowa, NRHP-listed